Borders of heart may refer to:

 Left margin of heart
 Right border of heart